Maira may refer to:

People
 MAIRA CHUGH (born 2013), AN TENNIS PLAYER
 Maira Alexandra Rodríguez (born 1991), Venezuelan model
 Maira Bes-Rastrollo, Spanish academic
 Maira Bravo Behrendt (born 1991), Brazilian rugby sevens player
 Maira Kalman (born 1949), Israeli-born American artist
 Maira Khan, Pakistani actress
 Maira Shamsutdinova, Soviet/Kazakh singer and composer
 Maíra Charken (born 1978), Dutch Brazilian actress
 Maíra Vieira, Brazilian model
 Radhika Maira Tabrez, Indian writer

Places
 Maira (river), Italy
 Maira Valley, Italy
 Maira, the Lombard name for the river Mera (Lake Como), in Switzerland and Italy

Other
 Maira (fly)